Selene (minor planet designation: 580 Selene) is a minor planet orbiting the Sun in the asteroid belt. The name Selene is that of an ancient Greek goddess of the Moon. The name may have been inspired by the asteroid's provisional designation 1905 SE.

This body orbits the Sun nearly midway between the orbits of Mars and Jupiter. The orbital eccentricity is slightly lower than that of Mars. Based on its light curve, Selene has an estimated rotation period of 0.3947±0.0004 days, or just under 9.5 hours. During each rotation, the apparent magnitude varies by 0.27. The approximate diameter of this asteroid is 46 km. (Some sources list a diameter of up to 56 km.) The albedo is about 7%, comparable to that of the Earth's Moon.

References

External links
 
 

Background asteroids
Selene
Selene
19051217
Selene